Architect of Fear is the eighth full-length album by the English heavy metal band Raven, released in 1991.

Track listing
All music by Raven, lyrics by John Gallagher.
"Architect of Fear Intro" – 1:21
"Architect of Fear" – 4:01
"Disciple" – 4:03
"Got the Devil" – 4:39
"Part of the Machine" – 3:59
"Under the Skin" – 5:27
"White Hot Anger" – 5:31
"Can't Run and Hide" – 2:48
"Blind Leading the Blind" – 5:03
"Relentless" – 3:49
"Just Let Me Go" – 6:08
"Heart Attack" – 3:52
"Sold Down the River" – 3:52

Personnel

Band members
John Gallagher - bass, vocals
Mark Gallagher - guitar
Joe Hasselvander - drums

Production
Detlef Mohrmann, Heimi Milkus - engineer, mixing
Peter Scott - synthesizers programming

References

1991 albums
Raven (British band) albums
SPV/Steamhammer albums